Katarina Ivanović (1811–1882) was a Serbian painter from the Austrian Empire (later Hungary in Austria-Hungary). She is regarded as the first Serbian female painter in modern art history.

Biography
Ivanović was born in Veszprém in the Austrian Empire to a middle-class family, and grew up in Székesfehérvár. After studying in Budapest, she worked in Belgrade from 1846 to 1847. In later years, she spent a lot of time traveling and living at different places, including Paris and Zagreb. Ivanović returned and died in Székesfehérvár in 1882.

During her studies at the Academy of Fine Arts in Vienna she travelled to Munich, Paris and Italy. She brought new themes to Serbian painting: Genre art and still life. She was stylistically in between the ideas of Biedermeier and Romanticism; she tried her hand at painting historical compositions but had her greatest achievements as a portrait painter. Of special note are her self-portraits. As the first educated Serbian painter, in 1876 she became the first woman member of the Serbian Learned Society and one of the founders of the National Museum in Belgrade.

Gallery

See also
 List of painters from Serbia
 Serbian art
 Konstantin Danil
 Nikola Aleksić
 Đura Jakšić
 Novak Radonić
 Stevan Todorović

References

Further reading

External links 

 
 Sanu Education Listing
 Her works (Serbian)
 Лепе и умне понос рода свог (Serbian)
 National Journal (Hungarian)
 Katarina Ivanović Brief Bio 

1811 births
1882 deaths
19th-century Serbian painters
Hungarian people of Serbian descent
Academy of Fine Arts Vienna alumni
Academy of Fine Arts, Munich alumni
Members of the Serbian Learned Society
19th-century Hungarian painters
Romantic painters
Serbian women painters
19th-century women artists
Serbian expatriates in Austria
Serbian expatriates in Germany
19th-century Serbian women
19th-century Hungarian women